Going to Hell Tour is the third headlining tour by American rock band The Pretty Reckless in support of their second studio album, Going to Hell.

Opening acts
 Born Cages (September 20, 2013)
 Heaven's Basement (September 22 – November 11, 2013)
 Louna (September 25 – November 3, 2013)
 Falling Through April (September 26 – October 15, 2014)

Setlist
The following set list is representative of the show on September 10, 2014 in House of Blues in Boston.
 "Follow Me Down"
 "Since You're Gone"
 "Why'd You Bring a Shotgun to the Party "
 "Sweet Things"
 "Cold Blooded"
 "Dear Sister"
 "Absolution"
Acoustic
 "Blame Me"
 "Zombie"
 "Waiting for a Friend"
Electric
 "Kill Me"
 "Heaven Knows"
 "Make Me Wanna Die"
 "Going to Hell"
Encore
 "My Medicine"
 "House on a Hill"
 "Fucked Up World"

Tour dates

Cancellations and rescheduled shows

References

2013 concert tours
2014 concert tours
2015 concert tours